Sarcodon excentricus is a species of tooth fungus in the family Bankeraceae. The fungus was originally described in 1951 by William Chambers Coker and Alma Holland Beers. The type collection was made by Lexemuel Ray Hesler in Cades Cove, Tennessee in 1937. Coker and Beers did not include a description of the fungus written in Latin—a requirement of the nomenclatural code at the time—and so their new species was not validly published. Richard Baird published S. excentricus validly in 1985.

References

External links
 

Fungi described in 1985
Fungi of the United States
excentricus
Fungi without expected TNC conservation status